Hendro Siswanto (born 12 March 1990) is an Indonesian professional footballer who plays as a defensive midfielder for Liga 1 club Borneo Samarinda.

International career 
He made his debut with Indonesia on 7 June 2013 in a friendly against Netherlands as a substitute.

Career statistics

International

International goals
Scores and results list Indonesia's goal tally first.

Honours

Clubs
Arema 
 East Java Governor Cup: 2013
 Menpora Cup: 2013
 Indonesian Inter Island Cup: 2014/15
 Indonesia President's Cup: 2017, 2019

International
Indonesia U-23
 Southeast Asian Games  Silver medal: 2011

References

External links
 Hendro Siswanto at kanalbola.com
 

Indonesian footballers
Living people
1990 births
People from Tuban
Indonesia youth international footballers
Indonesia international footballers
Liga 1 (Indonesia) players
Arema F.C. players
PSIS Semarang players
Persiba Balikpapan players
Persela Lamongan players
Borneo F.C. players
Indonesian Premier Division players
Association football fullbacks
Association football wingers
Southeast Asian Games silver medalists for Indonesia
Southeast Asian Games medalists in football
Competitors at the 2011 Southeast Asian Games
Sportspeople from East Java